The R384 is a Regional Route in South Africa that connects Carnarvon with Britstown.

Its western origin is from the R386 just north of Carnarvon. It heads east-north-east, though the Kareeberge via the Kareebospoort and Volstruispoort passes to reach Vosburg. Here it crosses the R403. From Vosburg it heads east to its terminus at the N12 at Britstown.

External links
 Routes Travel Info

References

Regional Routes in the Northern Cape